The Wolverine car was made by the Reid Manufacturing Company of Detroit, US from 1904 to 1905. The prototype was designed by Walter L. Marr. A test drive by Cycle and Automobile Journal reported that the car was good. In 1906 the company moved to Dundee, Michigan, and changed its name to Wolverine Automobile & Commercial Company of Dundee. where it closed in 1908.

This make was superseded by the Craig-Toledo.

Models

References 

Defunct motor vehicle manufacturers of the United States
Manufacturing companies based in Detroit
Motor vehicle manufacturers based in Michigan